María Nieves Rebolledo Vila,  better known by her stage name Bebe (born 9 May 1978), is a Spanish singer, songwriter, and actress who rose to international fame with the singles "Malo" and "Ella".

Biography
María Nieves Rebolledo Vila was born in Valencia, Spain, although very soon she moved to Extremadura, where she spent her entire childhood. Her parents were members of the Extremaduran folk group Surberina. Her breakthrough album in Spain was entitled Pafuera Telarañas though she gained international recognition after winning the Best New Artist award at the 2005 Latin Grammy Awards. She was nominated for five awards total. The first single from Pafuera Telarañas, "Malo" charted worldwide, and has since been used as the theme for the Argentinian series Mujeres Asesinas.

2006 Break
On 25 June 2006, Bebe announced that for now her album Pafuera Telarañas would be her debut and her farewell because she was retiring from the stage for a while.  She said that even if there is pressure to build up a discography, "I am not thinking of making another CD for quite some time. For a little more than two years I've promoted the same CD and I'm still not done." Nonetheless, she planned to continue touring the US and Mexico. "One has to recycle oneself or one becomes asphyxiated, one has to give oneself space or lose one's mind," she stated.

2009 Y.

She released a new album, Y., in 2009. Her song Se Fue was chosen as the Starbucks iTunes Pick of the Week for 3 November 2009.

Discography
2004: Pafuera Telarañas (Out with the Cobwebs)
2009: Y. (And.)
2012: Un Pokito de Rocanrol (A Lil' Bit of Rock n' Roll)
2015: Cambio de Piel (A Change of Skin)

Third-party covers
"Malo" by Avicii and Alkistis Protopsalti

Acting career
2002: Entre cien fuegos (TV)
2003: Al sur de Granada
2003: El oro de Moscú
2006: Busco
2006: La educación de las hadas
2006: Caótica Ana
2021: Libertad (TV)

Awards and nominations

Grammy Awards
The Grammy Award is an accolade by the National Academy of Recording Arts and Sciences of the United States to recognize outstanding achievement on the music industry. Bebe received one nomination.

|-
| 2010 || Y. || Best Latin Rock, Urban or Alternative Album || 
|-

Latin Grammy Awards
A Latin Grammy Award is an accolade by the Latin Academy of Recording Arts & Sciences to recognize outstanding achievement in the music industry. Bebe has received thirteen award nominations.

|-
| 2005 || Bebe || Best New Artist || 
|-
| 2005 || Pafuera Telarañas || Album of the Year || 
|-
| 2005 || "Malo" || Record of the Year || 
|-
| 2005 || "Malo" || Song of the Year || 
|-
| 2005 || Pafuera Telarañas || Best Female Pop Vocal Album || 
|-´
| 2009 || "Me Fuí" || Song of the Year || 
|-
| 2009 || "Me Fuí" || Best Short Form Music Video || 
|-
| 2010 || Y. || Album of the Year || 
|-
| 2010 || Y. || Best Female Pop Vocal Album || 
|-
| 2012 || Un Pokito de Rokanrol || Album of the Year || 
|-
| 2012 || "Mi Guapo" || Best Alternative Song || 
|-
| 2016 || "Cambio de Piel" || Best Alternative Music Album || 
|-
| 2016 || "10 Años Con Bebe" || Best Long Form Music Video || 
|-

References

External links

  Official Site
 Video of Appearance on Morning Becomes Eclectic

1978 births
Living people
Latin Grammy Award for Best New Artist
Singers from Extremadura
Spanish film actresses
Spanish television actresses
Capitol Latin artists
Latin music songwriters
21st-century Spanish singers
21st-century Spanish women singers
Women in Latin music